Der Wixxer (refers to German "Wichser", wanker) is a 2004 German parody of likewise German crime films based on works by Edgar Wallace, especially the film Der Hexer (1964) – a German adaption of The Ringer.

It is about two policemen, Inspector Very Long (Pastewka) and Chief Inspector Even Longer (Kalkofe) who must find the Wixxer, a gangster who wants to take over London's crime world.

Plot
The film begins at BlackWhite castle, one of the last castles in Black-and-white located in the United Kingdom. Residing there is the Earl of Cockwood (Thomas Fritsch), a notorious gangster. At some point, a tourist couple from Bitterfeld gets lost in the woods and witnesses a murder: the Monk with the Whip gets run over by a truck. At the wheel: The Wixxer, an evil gangster who wears a skull mask and wants to take over London's crime scene. To do that he arranges for the death of many of the current gangsters.

Scotland Yard sends its – allegedly – best man, Chief Inspector Even Longer. Since the Wixxer killed Even Longer's partner Rather Short (Thomas Heinze), a new partner is assigned: Very Long. They start to investigate and suspect the Earl of Cockwood. However, the Earl (who officially raises pugs and unofficially smuggles girl groups, amongst other things) is affected by the Wixxer's ambitions as well.

Their investigations bring the two inspectors back to London where they meet the dubious Harry Smeerlap (Lars Rudolph, pun with German “Schmierlappen” = creep, greasy rag) and his men, who work for Cockwood. Smeerlap tries to conceal his racketeerings, but Very Long and Even Longer can finally arrest him. At the end they are able to finally identify the Wixxer: it is none other than Rather Short who killed the original Wixxer and assumed his identity.

Background 
The film is based on a radio play that Oliver Kalkofe (together with Oliver Welke) performed in the 1990s during his time as a radio moderator at radio ffn.

The film was shot mostly in the Czech Republic, i.e. in Hostivar studios, the Kladnice mine and around Prague.

Three actors (Grit Boettcher as a waitress, Eva Ebner as Miss Drykant and Wolfgang Völz as Sir John) who appear in this film, also appeared in some of the original Wallace films made in the 60s. Joachim Fuchsberger was approached for a role but, after hearing the title, disgustedly declined. However, after seeing the film on DVD, he agreed to appear in the sequel, .

Music 
The title song "The Wizard" was performed by Right Said Fred and Anke Engelke (as her character Doris Dubinsky). "The Wizard" was originally performed by Madness of whom Kalkofe is a big fan.

Release 
The movie premiered on 10 May 2004 in Munich and was released on 20 May 2004. On its opening weekend, it grossed approximately $4,112,430. The film ended its theatrical run with approx. 1,9 million viewers.

Cast
 Oliver Kalkofe as Chief Inspector Even Longer / Woman in dungeon
 Bastian Pastewka as Inspector Very Long / Flower seller
 Thomas Fritsch as Earl of Cockwood
 Tanja Wenzel as Miss Jennifer Pennymarket
 Wolfgang Völz as Sir John
 Olli Dittrich as Dieter Dubinski
 Christoph Maria Herbst as Butler Alfons Hatler
 Eva Ebner as Miss Drykant
 Thomas Heinze as Rather Short
 Anke Engelke as Doris Dubinski
 Antoine Monot, Jr. as "Deaf Jack"
 Oliver Welke as Doctor Brinkman
 Lars Rudolph as Harry Smeerlap
 Andre Meyer as Pommeroy
 Daniel Steiner as Fitzgerald
 Cameo appearances: Günther Jauch, Achim Mentzel, Wildecker Herzbuben, No Angels

Critical reception
The score by Andreas Grimm was awarded in the Best Music category at the 2005 German Film Critics Association Awards.

References

External links 
  (German, now defunct)
  (English, international distributor)
 
 

2004 films
2000s crime comedy films
2000s German-language films
2000s parody films
German crime comedy films
Films set in castles
Films set in London
Films shot in the Czech Republic
German parody films
2004 comedy films
2000s German films